The road network of Cuba consists of  of roads, of which over   are paved and  are unpaved. The Caribbean country counts also  of motorways (autopistas).

Motorways

Overview
Cuba has eight toll-free expressways named Autopistas, seven of them centralized in the city of Havana and connected to each other by the Havana Ring Road, with the exception of the motorway to Mariel. The carriageway is divided and the lanes in each direction go from two to four. In the Isla de la Juventud, the dual carriageway from Nueva Gerona to La Fe is classified as motorway.

The principal motorways A1 and A4, running from the west to the east of the island and partly unbuilt (most of A1 sections), are the only one numbered and shortened with "A". As well as the Carretera Central covers the entire island, they are projected to perform the same function as motorways.

The route from Matanzas to Varadero of the Vía Blanca is the only toll road between Cuban motorways. The other autopistas have short routes and run from Havana to its suburban towns in Artemisa and Mayabeque provinces.

List of motorways

State highways
Cuba has a complex network of single carriageway highways, most of them numbered, named Carreteras or Circuitos. Some of the most prominent are:

Carretera Central (CC, Central Road, code N-1, 1,435 km), the most important one, is a west–east highway spanning the length of the island of Cuba from the municipality of Sandino, in Pinar del Río Province, to the one of Baracoa, in Guantánamo Province, for a total length of 1,435 km.
Circuito Norte (CN - Northern Road, 1,222 km): it runs from Mantua (Pinar del Río Province) to Baracoa (Guantánamo Province) crossing the northern coast of Cuba, through Viñales municipal territory, Bahía Honda, Mariel, Havana, Varadero, Matanzas, Cárdenas, Sagua la Grande, Caibarién, Yaguajay, Morón, Nuevitas, Puerto Padre, Holguín, Mayarí, Sagua de Tánamo and Moa. The Vía Blanca and the Panamericana, both classified as motorways, are part of it.
Circuito Sur (CS, Southern Road, 491 km): it runs from Artemisa to Sancti Spíritus, through Güira de Melena, Batabanó, Güines, Jagüey Grande, Aguada de Pasajeros, Cienfuegos and Trinidad.
Circuito Sur de Oriente (CSO, Southern Road of the Orient, 347 km): it runs from Bayamo to Santiago de Cuba through Manzanillo, Niquero, Pilón and Chivirico.

See also

License plates of Cuba
Cocotaxi
Havana MetroBus
Transport in Cuba
Rail transport in Cuba

Notes

References

External links